Henriette Kress is a Finnish herbalist.

Publications 
Kress is the author of two herbal books in English, four in Finnish and one in Swedish:
 Practical Herbs (2011), 
 Practical Herbs 2 (2013), 
 Mintusta voikukkaan - käytännön lääkekasvit (2000), 
 Hanhikista kissanminttuun - käytännön lääkekasvit (2001), 
 Käytännön lääkekasvit (2010), 
 Käytännön lääkekasvit 2 (2012), 
 Praktiska läkeörter (2011),

References

Further reading

External links 

Herbalists
Living people
Year of birth missing (living people)
German emigrants to Finland